Simona Szarková (born 2 January 1992) is a Slovak handballer who plays for Hungarian club Mosonmagyaróvári KC SE and the Slovak national team.

References

1992 births
Living people 
Slovak female handball players
Expatriate handball players
Slovak expatriate sportspeople in the Czech Republic
People from Nové Zámky
Sportspeople from the Nitra Region